Şeyhmus Erdinç (born 14 August 1992) is a Turkish amputee footballer who plays as a midfielder. He is a member of the Turkey national amputee football team.

Early life and education 
Şeyhmus Erdinç was born as the first child of the family in İzmir, Turkey on 14 August 1992 with a deformed left leg, which was later amputated below the knee; he started using a prosthesis. His father, who owned an apparel workshop, was an amateur footballer and took Şeyhmus to the football pitch from the age of one. His father died from tuberculosis when Şeyhmus was six years old, leaving him and his sister to be raised by their mother Necah and grandfather.

Upon finishing high school, he studied at the Vocational School of Physical Education in Gazi University, Ankara. After passing the Disabled Public Personnel Selection Exam of the Ministry of National Education in 2018, he was appointed in 2019 as a physical education teacher in Ankara. As a teacher, he developed a calm demeanour in order to be a role model for his students, in contrast to his youth, when he was more aggressive.

Sport career 
Erdinç played football at home with balls he made out of crumpled paper, after his mother refused to buy him a football because she did not want him play the sport. He started performance training in amputee football at the youth level, after convincing his mother to change her mind. In 2009, Erdinç met an amputee footballer at the prosthesis repair shop, who invited him to play at Altay SK. He learned to move with a crutch, obtained his license, and became an amputee footballer in 2010. Later, during a national team preparation camp, he met the head coach of the club Etimesgut BS, who had been amputated in his thirties. He invited Erdinç to move to Ankara to join his amputee football team. Erdinç agreed and continued his high school study there.

After playing six months for Altay, he was admitted to the Turkey national amputee football team. In 2011, he became a  permanent member of the national team. Since then, he has been playing in the midfielder position with jersey number 6, and was part of the team that won the championship title at the 2022 Amputee Football World Cup in Istanbul.

He debuted internationally at the 2012 World Cup held in Kaliningrad, Russia, scoring four goals in four matches. The national team returned home with a bronze medal. His further participations were at the World Cups in 2014 Culiacán, Mexica (bronze medal), 2016, 2018 San Juan de los Lagos, Mexico (silver medal), 2022 Istanbul, Turkey (gold medal), as well as at the European Championships in 2021 Kraków, Poland (gold medal).

Honours 
International
 World Cup
 Winners (1):  2022
 Runners-up (1): 2018
 Third places (2): 2012, 2014
 European Championship
 Winners (1): 2021

References

1992 births
Living people
Footballers from İzmir
Gazi University alumni
Turkish schoolteachers
Turkish amputee football players
Turkey international amputee football players
Association football midfielders